The Paraguayan Workers Confederation or CPT is a national trade union center in Paraguay. It was formed in 1951 with close ties to the Colorado Party. In 1958, after a general strike, many unionists were exiled, and formed the CPT-E, a CPT in exile.

CPT again operates in Paraguay. Until 1974 it was affiliated with the International Trade Union Confederation, but is now a member of the International Trade Union Confederation.

References

Trade unions in Paraguay
International Trade Union Confederation
Trade unions established in 1951
1951 establishments in Paraguay